Here is a list of educational institutes in Jamshedpur.

Autonomous institutions

 National Institute of Technology, Jamshedpur
 XLRI – Xavier School of Management

General Colleges

 The Graduate School College for Women, Jamshedpur
 Jamshedpur Co-operative College
 Jamshedpur Women's College
 Jamshedpur Worker's College
 J. K. S. College, Jamshedpur	
 Karim City College, Jamshedpur
 Lal Bahadur Shastri Memorial College

Medical

 Awadh Dental College and Hospital
 Mahatma Gandhi Memorial Medical College, Jamshedpur

Polytechnic

 Al Kabir Polytechnic

University

 Arka Jain University
 Netaji Subhas University

Schools 

 Carmel Junior College, Sonari, Jamshedpur
 Vidya Bharti Chinmaya Vidyalaya 
 Loyola School
 Kerala Samajam Model School
 Narbheram Hansraj English School
 Sacred Heart Convent High School

References

Jamshedpur
 
Jamshedpur Education